is a single by Japanese band An Cafe. The first track will be featured in their album Shikisai Moment. The song peaked at No. 64 on the Japanese singles chart.

Track listing

"Wagamama Koushinkyouku (我侭行進曲 )
"Momo Iro Pure Moto Dekiai Zakura" (桃色ピュア的溺愛ザクラ)

References

An Cafe songs
Karakuri Hitei
Loop Ash Records singles
2005 songs